The A*STAR Talent Search (ATS) is a research-based science competition in Singapore for high school students between 15–21 years of age.  It was formerly known as National Science Talent Search. The ATS is an annual competition which acknowledges and rewards students who have a strong aptitude for science & technology. This competition provides students the opportunity to showcase their stellar projects and encourage them to further explore science and technology.

The ATS is administered by the Agency for Science, Technology and Research (A*STAR) and Science Centre Singapore (SCS) from 2006. Participants are required to compete in the Singapore Science and Engineering Fair (SSEF) and winners from the fair will then proceed to the short-listing round of ATS. The panel of judges consists of distinguished scientists from local and international universities, as well as A*STAR research institutes and a Nobel Laureate as the Chief Judge. ATS winners need to display resourcefulness, mastery of scientific concepts, as well as passion for scientific research.

The First Prize winner will be given S$5000, inclusive of a sponsored overseas conference.

Winners and finalists (top 8 students) of the ATS have gone on to top universities worldwide, such as National University of Singapore, Harvard University, Princeton University, Yale University, Stanford University, Massachusetts Institute of Technology and California Institute of Technology in the United States, and University of Cambridge, University of Oxford and Imperial College London in the United Kingdom.

References

External links
 ATS (A*STAR Graduate Academy) website
 ATS (Science Centre Singapore) website

Science competitions